A 3-way lamp, also known as a tri-light, is a lamp that uses a 3-way light bulb to produce three levels of light in a low-medium-high configuration. A 3-way lamp requires a 3-way bulb and socket, and a 3-way switch.

In 3-way incandescent light bulbs, each of the filaments operates at full voltage. So unlike incandescent bulbs controlled by a dimmer, the color of the light does not change between the three steps of light available. Lamp bulbs with dual carbon filaments were built as early as 1902 to allow adjustable lighting levels.

Certain compact fluorescent lamp bulbs are designed to replace 3-way incandescent bulbs, and have an extra contact and circuitry to bring about similar light level. In recent years, LED 3-way bulbs have become available as well.

Three-way bulbs

A 3-way incandescent bulb has two filaments designed to produce different amounts of light. The two filaments can be activated separately or together, giving three different amounts of light. One common 3-way incandescent bulb is the 50/100/150 W. It has a low-power 50 W filament and a medium-power 100 W filament. When they are both energized at the same time, 150 W of power is delivered, and a high level of light is produced. Usually screw-base 3-way bulbs fit into regular Type A sockets (E26D after ISO 60061-1:2014). Larger 3-way bulbs (up to 300 W) have a larger "mogul" base (E39D). These 3-way bulbs can also come in spiral-shaped compact fluorescent lamps.

Three-way sockets

A standard screw lamp socket has only two electrical contacts.  In the center of the bottom of a standard socket is the hot contact (contact one in photo), which typically looks like a small metal tongue bent over.  The threaded metal shell is itself the neutral contact (contact three in photo). When a standard bulb is screwed into a standard socket, a matching contact on the bottom of the bulb presses against the metal tongue in the center of the socket, creating the live connection.  The metal threads of the bulb base   touch the socket shell, which creates the neutral connection, and this is how the electrical circuit is completed.

A 3-way socket has three electrical contacts.  In addition to the two contacts of the standard socket, a third contact is added.  This contact is positioned off-center in the bottom of the socket (contact two in photo).  This extra contact matches a ring-shaped contact on the bottom of a 3-way bulb, which creates the connection for the second filament inside the bulb.  A problem of these devices is that the ring contact of the socket (contact two in photo) digs into the lead seal on the lamp bulb's contact ring and this connection tends to fail early (sometimes in months), leading to intermittent flashes, popping noises, and loss of power to the low wattage filament as the lead seal on the bulb's ring alternately melts and solidifies.

The center contact of the bulb typically connects to the medium-power filament, and the ring connects to the low-power filament.  Thus, if a 3-way bulb is screwed into a standard light socket that has only a center contact, only the medium-power filament operates.  In the case of the 50/100/150 W bulb, putting this bulb in a regular lamp socket will result in it behaving like a normal 100 W bulb.

3-way, 2-circuit switches

The switch used to control a 3-way lamp is usually a rotary switch or a pull-chain switch.  Although it is referred to as a 3-way switch, it has four positions, off, lamp one (low), lamp two (medium), and lamps one and two (high). When properly connected to a 3-way socket containing a 3-way bulb, this switch will first power one filament, then the other filament, then both, then return to the off position.  To do this, the switch must be capable of operating two different circuits.  Internal to the switch there are two sets of switch contacts that are not connected electrically, but which are connected mechanically in such a way that they operate together as shown in this table.

See also
 Floor lamp
 Multiway switching

References

Electrical wiring
Types of lamp